A Stradivarius is a violin made by the Stradivari family.

Stradivarius may also refer to:
 Stradivarius (clothing brand), a Spanish clothing fashion brand
 Stradivarius (horse) (born 2014), British-trained racehorse
 Stradivarius (record label), an Italian record label
 Stradivarius (film), 1935 German film
 Stradivarius (The Walking Dead), an episode of the television series The Walking Dead
 Stradivarius trumpet, a brand of trumpet of the Vincent Bach Corporation

See also
 , includes many instruments known as the "X... Stradivarius"
 Antonio Stradivari, the most famous violin maker of the family
 List of Stradivarius instruments
 Stratavarious, an album by Ginger Baker
 "Strat-O-Various", a 1989 song by Howe II from High Gear
 Stratovarius, a Finnish power metal band